Communion: Live at the Union Chapel is the second full-length live album (the first acoustic) by the rock band Therapy?. It was self-released by the band on 21 August 2017. The album was recorded on 1 December 2016 at Union Chapel, Islington, London, which was the last date of the band's acoustic "Wood & Wire" European tour. A total of 24 songs were played on the night and are spread across two discs.

An exclusive third CD featuring 4 live songs not played at Union Chapel (two from the Empire Music Hall, Belfast on 28 April 2017, and two from Arminius, Rotterdam on 25 November 2016) was included for all pre-orders made prior to 19 August 2017.

Track listing

Disc one

Disc two

Pre-order bonus disc

Personnel 
Therapy?
Andy Cairns – vocals, guitar
Neil Cooper – drums
Michael McKeegan – bass, vocals
with:
Jenny Nendick – cello on "Gone" and "Diane"
Steven Firth – guitar, vocals on "Lonely Cryin' Only" and "Stop It You're Killing Me"
Technical
Richard Baker – engineer, mixing
Eric Duvet – photography
Paul Burgess – sleeve design

References

External links 
 

2017 albums
Therapy? albums